Bharatpur may refer to:

India
Bharatpur division, Rajasthan, India
Bharatpur district, within Bharatpur division
Bharatpur, Rajasthan, a city in Bharatpur district
Bharatpur (Lok Sabha constituency)
Bharatpur State, former princely state in modern Rajasthan
Bharatpur, Chhattisgarh, a subdivision and tehsil of Koriya district in Chhattisgarh
Bharatpur, Murshidabad, a village in Murshdiababd district, West Bengal
Bharatpur I, community development block
Bharatpur II, community development 
Bharatpur, Purba Bardhaman, a village in Purba Bardhaman district, West Bengal

Nepal
Bharatpur, Nepal, a city in Nepal
Bharatpur Airport
Bharatpur, Dhanusa, village in Nepal
Bharatpur, Mahottari, village in Nepal